The 1963 Colorado State Rams football team represented Colorado State University as an independent during the 1963 NCAA University Division football season. In their second season under head coach Mike Lude, the Rams compiled a 3–7 record.

Schedule

References

Colorado State
Colorado State Rams football seasons
Colorado State Rams football